Yeferson Andrés Contreras Villamizar (born 10 August 1999) is a Colombian professional footballer who plays as a forward for Croatian club HNK Šibenik on loan from América de Cali.

Club career
In February 2020, Contreras was loaned to USL Championship club Indy Eleven.

References

External links

Yeferson Contreras at USL Championship

1999 births
Living people
América de Cali footballers
Orsomarso S.C. footballers
Indy Eleven players
Categoría Primera A players
Categoría Primera B players
USL Championship players
Colombian expatriate sportspeople in Croatia
Colombian footballers
Association football forwards
People from Cúcuta